The list of ship commissionings in 1929 includes a chronological list of all ships commissioned in 1929.


References 
 http://www.unithistories.com/units_index/default.asp?file=../units_dutch/navy_destroyers.asp?

1929